City, University of London, is a public research university in London, United Kingdom, and a member institution of the federal University of London. It was founded in 1894 as the Northampton Institute, and became a university when The City University was created by royal charter in 1966. The Inns of Court School of Law, which merged with City in 2001, was established in 1852, making it the university's oldest constituent part. City joined the federal University of London on 1 September 2016, becoming part of the eighteen colleges and ten research institutes that then made up that university.

City has strong links with the City of London, and the Lord Mayor of London serves as the university's rector. The university has its main campus in Central London in the London Borough of Islington, with additional campuses in Islington, the city, the West End and East End. It is organised into six schools, within which there are around forty academic departments and centres, including the Department of Journalism, the Business School, and City Law School which incorporates the Inns of Court School of Law. The annual income of the institution for 2021–22 was £262.1 million, of which £12.9 million was from research grants and contracts, with an expenditure of £328.2 million.

City is a founding member of the WC2 University Network which developed for collaboration between leading universities of the heart of major world cities particularly to address cultural, environmental and political issues of common interest to world cities and their universities. The university is a member of the Association of MBAs, EQUIS and Universities UK. Alumni of City include a founding father, members of Parliament of the United Kingdom, Prime Ministers of the United Kingdom, governors, politicians and CEOs.

History

Origins

City traces its origin to the Northampton Institute and the City Law School (established in 1852). The first was named after the Marquess of Northampton who donated the land on which the institute was built, between Northampton Square and St John Street in Islington. The institute was established to provide for the education and welfare of the local population. It was constituted under the City of London Parochial Charities Act (1883), with the objective of "the promotion of the industrial skill, general knowledge, health and well-being of young men and women belonging to the poorer classes".

Northampton Polytechnic Institute was an institute of technology in Clerkenwell, London, founded in 1894. Its first Principal was Robert Mullineux Walmsley.

Alumni include Colin Cherry, Stuart Davies and Anthony Hunt. Arthur George Cocksedge, a British gymnast who competed in the 1920 Summer Olympics, was a member of the Northampton Polytechnic Institute's Gymnastics Club and was Champion of the United Kingdom in 1920. In 1937 Maurice Dennis of the (Northampton Polytechnic ABC) was the 1937 ABA Middleweight Champion. Frederick Handley Page was a lecturer in aeronautics at the institute. The Handley Page Type A, the first powered aircraft designed and built by him, ended up as an instructional airframe at the school. The novelist Eric Ambler studied engineering at the institute.

The six original departments at the institute were Applied Physics and Electrical Engineering; Artistic Crafts; Domestic Economy and Women's Trades; Electro-Chemistry; Horology (the science of time and art of clock-making); and Mechanical Engineering and Metal Trades.

20th century
A separate technical optics department was established in 1903–04. In 1909, the first students qualified for University of London BSc degrees in engineering as internal students. The Institute had been involved in aeronautics education since that year, and the School of Engineering and Mathematical Sciences celebrated the centenary of aeronautics at City in 2009. The institute was used for the 1908 Olympic Games; boxing took place there.

In 1957, the institute was designated a "College of Advanced Technology".

The institute's involvement in information science began in 1961, with the introduction of a course on "Collecting and Communicating Scientific Knowledge". City received its royal charter in 1966, becoming "The City University" to reflect the institution's close links with the City of London. The Apollo 15 astronauts visited City in 1971, and presented the Vice-Chancellor, Tait, with a piece of heat shield from the Apollo 15 rocket.

In October 1995, it was announced that City University would merge with both the St Bartholomew School of Nursing & Midwifery and the Charterhouse College of Radiography, doubling the number of students in City's Institute of Health Sciences to around 2,500.

21st century
The university formed a strategic alliance with Queen Mary, University of London, in April 2001. In May 2001, a fire in the college building gutted the fourth-floor offices and roof. In August 2001 City and the Inns of Court School of Law agreed to merge. Following a donation from Sir John Cass's Foundation, a multimillion-pound building was built at 106 Bunhill Row for the Business School.

A new £23 million building to house the School of Social Sciences and the Department of Language and Communication Science was opened in 2004. The reconstruction and redevelopment of the university's Grade II listed college building (following the fire in 2001) was completed in July 2006.

In 2007 the School of Arts received a £10m building refurbishment. A new students' union venue opened in October 2008 called "TEN squared", which provides a hub for students to socialise in during the day and hosts a wide range of evening entertainment including club nights, society events and quiz nights.

In January 2010, premises were shared with the University of East Anglia (UEA) London, following City's partnership with INTO University Partnerships. Since then City has resumed its own International Foundation Programme to prepare students for their pre-university year. City was ranked among the top 30 higher education institutions in the UK by the Times Higher Education Table of Tables.

In April 2011, it was announced that the current halls of residence and Saddler's Sports Centre will be closed and demolished for rebuilding in June 2011. The new student halls and sports facility, now known as CitySport, opened in 2015.

In September 2016 The City University became a member institution of the federal University of London and changed its name to City, University of London.

Campus

City has sites throughout London, with the main campus located at Northampton Square in the Finsbury area of Islington. The Rhind Building which houses the School of Arts and Social Sciences is directly west of Northampton Square. A few buildings of the main campus are located in nearby Goswell Road in Clerkenwell.

Other academic sites are:
 The City Law School (incorporating the former Inns of Court School of Law) in Holborn, Camden
 Bayes Business School in St Luke's, Islington, and at 200 Aldersgate in Smithfield, City of London
 INTO City in Spitalfields, Tower Hamlets

Organisation and administration

The rector of City, University of London, is ex officio the Lord Mayor of the City of London. The day-to-day running of the university is the responsibility of the president. The current president is Sir Anthony Finkelstein.

Schools
City, University of London, is organised into six schools:
 The City Law School, incorporating The Centre for Legal Studies and the Inns of Court School of Law
 School of Health & Psychological Sciences, incorporating St Bartholomew School of Nursing & Midwifery
 School of Communication & Creativity, including the Department of Journalism
 School of Policy and Global Affairs
 School of Science & Technology
 Bayes Business School (formerly Cass Business School)

Finances
In the financial year ended 31 July 2011, City had a total income (including share of joint ventures) of £178.6 million (2008/09 – £174.4 million) and total expenditure of £183.62 million (2008/09 – £178.82 million). Key sources of income included £39.58 million from Funding Council grants (2008/09 – £39.52 million), £116.91 million from tuition fees and education contracts (2008/09 – £104.39 million), £7.86 million from research grants and contracts (2008/09 – £9.29 million), £1.04 from endowment and investment income (2008/09 – £1.83 million) and £15.05 million from other income (2008/09 – £19.37 million).

During the 2010/11 financial year, City had a capital expenditure of £9.77 million (2008/09 – £16.13 million).

At year end, City had reserves and endowments of £112.89 million (2009/10 – £110.05 million) and total net assets of £147.64 million (2008/09 – £147.27 million).

Academic profile

Courses and rankings

City, University of London, offers Bachelor's, Master's, and Doctoral degrees as well as certificates and diplomas at both undergraduate and postgraduate level. More than two-thirds of City's programmes are recognised by the appropriate professional bodies such as the BCS, BPS, CILIP, ICE, RICS, HPC etc. in recognition of the high standards of relevance to the professions. The university also has an online careers network where over 2,000 former students offer practical help to current students.

The City Law School offers courses for undergraduates, postgraduates, master graduates and professional courses leading to qualification as a solicitor or barrister, as well as continuing professional development. Its Legal Practice Course has the highest quality rating from the Solicitors Regulation Authority.

The Department of Radiography (part of the School of Community and Health Sciences) offers two radiography degrees, the BSc (Hons) Radiography (Diagnostic Imaging) and BSc (Hons) Radiography (Radiotherapy and Oncology), both of which are recognised by the Health Professions Council (HPC).

Partnerships and collaborations

CETL
Queen Mary, University of London, and City, University of London, were jointly awarded Centre for Excellence in Teaching and Learning (CETL) status by the Higher Education Funding Council for England (HEFCE) in recognition of their work in skills training for 3,000 students across six healthcare professions.

City of London
City, University of London, has links with businesses in the City of London. City has also joined forces with other universities such as Queen Mary and the Institute of Education (both part of the University of London) with which it jointly delivers several leading degree programmes.

LCACE
London Centre for Arts and Cultural Exchange is a consortium of nine universities. It was established in 2004 to foster collaboration and to promote and support the exchange of knowledge between the consortium's partners and London's arts and cultural sectors. The nine institutions involved are: University of the Arts London; Birkbeck, University of London; City, University of London; The Courtauld Institute of Art; Goldsmiths, University of London; Guildhall School of Music & Drama; King's College London; Queen Mary, University of London, and Royal Holloway, University of London.

WC2 University Network
City is a founding member of the WC2 University Network, a network of universities developed with the goal of bringing together leading universities located in the heart of major world cities in order to address cultural, environmental and political issues of common interest to world cities and their universities. In addition to City, University of London, the founding members of WC2 members are: City University of New York, Technische Universität Berlin, Universidade de São Paulo, Hong Kong Polytechnic University, Universidad Autonoma Metropolitana, Saint Petersburg State Polytechnical University, Politecnico di Milano, University of Delhi, Northeastern University Boston and Tongji University.

Erasmus Mundus MULTI
City was selected as the sole British university to take part in the selective Erasmus Mundus MULTI programme, funded by the European Commission to promote scientific exchange between Europe and the industrialised countries of South-East Asia. It is the first Erasmus program to involve universities outside of Europe. In addition to City, the partner universities are: Aix-Marseille University (France), Univerzita Karlova v Praze (Czech Republic), Freie Universität Berlin (Germany), Universität des Saarlandes (Germany), Università di Pisa (Italy), Universidad de Sevilla (Spain), The Hong Kong Polytechnic University (Hong Kong, SAR China), Universiti Brunei Darussalam (Brunei), University of Macau (Macau, SAR China), Nanyang Technological University (Singapore), and National Taiwan University (Taiwan).

UCL Partners
City has joined the executive group of UCL Partners, one of five accredited academic health science groups in the UK. City was invited to join the partnership in recognition of its expertise in nursing, allied health, health services research and evaluation and health management.

Student life

Students' Union
The City Students' Union is run primarily by students through three elected sabbatical officers, an executive committee and a union council, with oversight by a trustee board. The Students' Union provides support, representation, facilities, services, entertainment and activities for its members. It is run for students, by students.

Student media
City currently has two student-run media outlets, including Carrot Radio, which was co-founded by journalism postgraduates Jordan Gass-Pooré and Winston Lo in the autumn of 2018. Carrot Radio currently records weekday podcasts. The second is the student-led online magazine, Carrot Magazine. They released their first print magazine in December 2017.

Other
For a number of years, City students have taken part in the annual Lord Mayor's Show, representing the university in one of the country's largest and liveliest parades.

Sustainability ranking
City ranked joint 5th out of the 168 universities surveyed in the 2019 People & Planet league table of the most sustainable UK universities having climbed from 7th place in the 2016 league. In both the 2016 and 2019 rankings, it was the highest ranking University of London institution, and one of only four London institutions in the top twenty.

The league table's Fossil Free Scorecard report, drawn from Freedom of Information requests, found that £800,000 (6.4%) of City's £12.5m endowment was invested in fossil fuels, and that the institution had not made a public commitment to fossil fuel divestment. It also noted nearly £1m of research funding into renewables since 2001 with just £64k of total funding from fossil fuel companies; and no honorary degrees or board positions held by fossil fuel executives.

Notable people

Notable alumni

Government, politics and society

 Muhammad Ali Jinnah – founder of Pakistan, first Governor-General of Pakistan graduated from the Inns of Court school of Law (now part of The City Law School)
 Clement Attlee – Labour Prime Minister of the United Kingdom from 1945 to 1951
 H. H. Asquith – Liberal Prime Minister of the United Kingdom from 1908 to 1916
 Tony Blair – Labour Party Prime Minister of the United Kingdom from 1997 to 2007, graduated from the Inns of Court School of Law (now part of The City Law School)
 Christos Staikouras – Finance Minister of Greece from 2019 to present
 Roderic Bowen – Welsh Liberal Party politician
 Robert Chote – chief of the Office for Budget Responsibility; former director of Institute for Fiscal Studies
 Ali Dizaei – former police commander
 Jody Dunn – Liberal Democrat politician, and a barrister specialising in family law
 Sir James Dutton – Royal Marine general and former deputy commander of the International Security Assistance Force
 Chloë Fox – Australian politician, former Labor MP for the South Australian electoral district of Bright
 Mahatma Gandhi – Leader of the Indian Independence Movement, graduated in 1891 from the Inns of Court School of Law (now part of The City Law School)
 Syed Sharifuddin Pirzada – Noted Pakistani lawyer & Politician. Also served as 5th secretary general of Organisation of Islamic Cooperation.
 James Hart – Commissioner of the City of London Police
 David Heath – Politician and Liberal Democrat Member of Parliament for Somerton and Frome
 Syed Kamall – Conservative Party politician and Member of the European Parliament for the London European Parliament constituency
 David Lammy – Labour MP for Tottenham
Ferdinand Alexander “Sandro” Araneta Marcos III – Member of the Philippine House of Representatives, eldest son of President Bongbong Marcos and First Lady Liza Araneta-Marcos, grandson of former President Ferdinand Marcos and former First Lady Imelda Marcos.
 Barbara Mensah – Judge
 Liu Mingkang – Chinese Politician and Businessman, current Chairman of the China Banking Regulatory Commission, former Vice-Governor of the China Development Bank
 Jawaharlal Nehru – First Prime Minister of the Republic of India
 Houda Nonoo – Bahraini Ambassador to the United States
 Patrick O'Flynn – UK Independence Party MEP
 Stav Shaffir – Youngest member of the Israeli Knesset, leader of the social justice movement
 Aris Spiliotopoulos – Minister of Greek Tourism
 Margaret Thatcher – Conservative Party Prime Minister of the United Kingdom from 1979 to 1990, graduated from the Inns of Court School of Law (now part of The City Law School)
 Ivy Williams – First woman to be called to the English bar

Arts, science and academia

 L. Bruce Archer – British mechanical engineer and Professor of Design Research at the Royal College of Art
 Susan Bickley – Mezzo-soprano in opera and classical music
 George Daniels – Horologist, regarded as the greatest watchmaker of modern times and inventor of the coaxial escapement
 Jerry Fishenden – Technologist, former Microsoft National Technology Officer for the UK
 Julia Gomelskaya – Ukrainian contemporary music composer, professor of Odessa State Music Academy in Ukraine
 Norman Gowar – Professor of Mathematics at the Open University and Principal of Royal Holloway College, University of London
 Clare Hammond – Concert pianist
 David Hirsh – Academic and sociologist
 Muhammad Iqbal – Muslim poet, philosopher and politician, born in present-day Pakistan, graduated from the Inns of Court School of Law and University of Cambridge
John Hodge – Aeronautical Engineer who played a key role in NASA and America's space race.
 John Loder – Sound engineer, record producer and founder of Southern Studios, as well as a former member of EXIT
 Sharon Maguire – Director of Bridget Jones's Diary
 Rhodri Marsden – Journalist, musician and blogger; columnist for The Independent
 Robin Milner – Computer scientist and recipient of the 1991 ACM Turing Award
 Bernard Miles – Actor and founder of the Mermaid Theatre.
 John Palmer – Instrumental and electroacoustic music composer
Sebastian Payne – Journalist
 Ziauddin Sardar – Academic and scholar of Islamic issues, Commissioner of the Equality and Human Rights Commission
Theresa Wallach – Pioneer female engineer, motorcycle adventurer, author, educator and entrepreneur, holder of Brooklands Gold Star.

Business and finance

 Winston Set Aung – Politician, Economist and Management Consultant, incumbent Deputy Governor of the Central Bank of Myanmar
 Brendan Barber – General Secretary of the Trades Union Congress
Jonathan Breeze – Founder and CEO of Jet Republic, private jet airline company in Europe 
Michael Boulos – Associate director of Callian Capital Group, and partner of Tiffany Trump
 William Castell – Former Chairman of the Wellcome Trust and a Director of General Electric and BP, former CEO of Amersham plc 
 Peter Cullum – British entrepreneur
 James J. Greco – Former CEO and President of Sbarro
 Sir Stelios Haji-Ioannou – Founder of easyGroup
Tom Ilube – CBE, British entrepreneur and Chair of the RFU
 Bob Kelly – Former CEO of Bank of New York Mellon and CFO of Mellon Financial Corporation and Wachovia Corporation
 Muhtar Kent – Former CEO and Chairman of The Coca-Cola Company
 William Lewis – Former CEO Dow Jones Publisher, The Wall Street Journal
 Ian Livingstone – Chairman and co-owner, London & Regional Properties
 Liu Mingkang – Former Chairman of the China Banking Regulatory Commission
 Dick Olver – Former Chairman of BAE Systems, member of the board of directors at Reuters
 Syed Ali Raza – Former president and Chairman of the National Bank of Pakistan
 Martin Wheatley – Former CEO of the Financial Conduct Authority 
 Brian Wynter – Governor of the Bank of Jamaica 
 Durmuş Yılmaz – Governor of the Central Bank of Turkey

Media and entertainment

Samira Ahmed – Channel 4 News presenter, BBC News presenter, writer and journalist
Decca Aitkenhead – Journalist
Joanna Blythman – Non-fiction writer, Britain's leading investigative food journalist 
Emily Buchanan – BBC World Affairs correspondent
Sally Bundock – BBC presenter
Ellie Crisell – BBC presenter 
Imogen Edwards-Jones – Novelist
Gamal Fahnbulleh – Sky News presenter and journalist
Mimi Fawaz, BBC presenter and journalist
Michael Fish – BBC weatherman
Adam Fleming – CBBC reporter
Lourdes Garcia-Navarro – Journalist, Jerusalem foreign correspondent for National Public Radio (NPR)
Alex Graham – chairman of PACT and the Scott Trust
Michael Grothaus – Novelist and journalist; author of Epiphany Jones
Rachel Horne – BBC and Virgin Radio presenter and journalist
Faisal Islam – BBC News economics editor
Gillian Joseph – Sky News presenter
Kirsty Lang – BBC presenter and journalist
Ellie Levenson – Freelance journalist and author
William Lewis – Journalist and editor of The Daily Telegraph
Donal MacIntyre – Investigative journalist
Sharon Maguire – Writer and director, directed Bridget Jones's Diary
Rhodri Marsden – Journalist, musician and blogger; columnist for The Independent
Sharon Mascall – Journalist, broadcaster and writer; lecturer at the University of South Australia
Lucrezia Millarini – Freelance journalist and ITV newsreader
Dermot Murnaghan – Presenter on Sky News
Tiff Needell – Grand Prix driver, presenter of Fifth Gear on Five
Maryam Nemazee – presenter for Al Jazeera London
Linda Papadopoulos – psychologist, appearing occasionally on TV
Catherine Pepinster – journalist, religion writer 
Raj Persaud – British consultant psychiatrist, broadcaster, and author on psychiatry
Richard Preston – Novelist
Gavin Ramjaun – Television presenter and journalist
Sophie Raworth – Newsreader, presenter on BBC One O'Clock News
Apsara Reddy – Journalist
Joel Rubin – World-renowned klezmer clarinetist 
Ian Saville – British magician 
Barbara Serra – Presenter for Al Jazeera London 
Sarah Walker – BBC Radio 3 presenter
Josh Widdicombe – Comedian and presenter

Notable faculty and staff

 Rosemary Crompton –  Professor of Sociology
 Roy Greenslade – Journalist
 Steven Haberman – Professor of Actuarial Science at City, University of London
 Corinna Hawkes – Professor of Food Policy
 Rosemary Hollis – Professor of International Politics at City, University of London
 Jamal Nazrul Islam – Physicist, Mathematician, Cosmologist, Astronomer
 Ernest Krausz (1931-2018) - Israeli professor of sociology and President at Bar Ilan University
 David Leigh – Journalist
 David Marks – Psychologist
 Penny Marshall – Journalist
 Stewart Purvis – Broadcaster
 Denis Smalley – Composer
 Bill Thompson – Journalist
 David Willets – Conservative Member of Parliament for Havant; Shadow Secretary of State for Education and Skills

Vice-Chancellors (Pre-2016) / Presidents (Post-2016)
 1966–1974: Sir James Sharp Tait
 1974–1978: Sir Edward W. Parkes
 1978–1998: Raoul Franklin
 1998–2007: David William Rhind
 2007–2009: Malcolm Gillies
 2009–2010: Julius Weinberg (acting)
 2010–2021: Sir Paul Curran
2021–Present: Sir Anthony Finkelstein

In popular culture
City University's Bastwick Street Halls of Residence in Islington was the first home of MasterChef following its 2005 revival.

See also
Armorial of UK universities
College of advanced technology (United Kingdom)
List of universities in the UK

References

External links

 City, University of London
 City, University of London, Students Union 
 Lists of Northampton Polytechnic Institute students
 List of Northampton Polytechnic Institute military personnel, 1914–1918

 
Optometry schools
Schools of informatics
Educational institutions established in 1894
1894 establishments in England
Venues of the 1908 Summer Olympics
Olympic boxing venues
Universities UK